Nishat Chunian Group is a Pakistani vertically integrated textile company which was founded in 1990. It is listed on the Pakistan Stock Exchange and is one of the largest textile company of Pakistan.

History
Nishat Chunian was founded in 1990 with a manufacturing facility of 14,400 spindles.

In July 2018, Nishat Chunian divested its shareholding in Nishat Chunian Entertainment.

Subsidaries
Following are the two subsidaries:
 Nishat Chunian USA Inc.
 Nishat Chunian Electric Corporation Ltd.

References

Nishat Group
Textile companies of Pakistan
Manufacturing companies established in 1990
Pakistani companies established in 1990
Companies based in Lahore
Companies listed on the Pakistan Stock Exchange